The Our Lady of the Annunciation Chapel at Annunciation Priory in Bismarck, North Dakota, was listed on the National Register of Historic Places in 2020.  It is located at 7500 University Drive and is the chapel of University of Mary.

It is a work of world-class modernist architect Marcel Breuer.  He termed this chapel his "jewel on the prairie."

It was built in 1963 and is Brutalist in style.  It has a pipe organ of 1,641 pipes.  The chapel can seat 500 persons.

See also
Annunciation Monastery (University of Mary)

References

External links

Roman Catholic churches completed in 1963
Churches on the National Register of Historic Places in North Dakota
National Register of Historic Places in Bismarck, North Dakota
Brutalist architecture in the United States
University and college buildings on the National Register of Historic Places in North Dakota
1963 establishments in North Dakota
Modernist architecture in North Dakota
University and college chapels in the United States
University of Mary
Roman Catholic chapels in the United States
Marcel Breuer buildings